The 2019–20 CAF Confederation Cup knockout stage began on 1 March with the quarter-finals and ended on 25 October 2020 with the final to decide the champions of the 2019–20 CAF Confederation Cup. A total of eight teams compete in the knockout stage.

Times are GMT as listed by CAF (local times, even if not different, are in parentheses).

Round and draw dates
The schedule is as follows.

Following the quarter-finals, due to the COVID-19 pandemic in Africa, the semi-finals, originally scheduled for 3 May (first legs) and 10 May (second legs), were postponed indefinitely on 11 April 2020, and the final, originally scheduled for 24 May, was also postponed on 18 April 2020. On 30 June 2020, the CAF Executive Committee proposed that the competition would resume with a Final Four format played as single matches in Morocco. On 3 August 2020, the CAF announced that the competition would resume with the semi-finals played on 22 September, and the final played on 27 September. On 10 September 2020, the CAF announced that at the request of the Royal Moroccan Football Federation, the semi-finals were rescheduled to 19–20 October, and the final to 25 October.

Format

In the knockout stage, the quarter-finals were played over two legs, with each team playing one leg at home. The team that scored more goals on aggregate over the two legs advanced to the next round. If the aggregate score was level, the away goals rule is applied, i.e. the team that scored more goals away from home over the two legs advanced. If away goals were also equal, then extra time was not played and the winners were decided by a penalty shoot-out.

The semi-finals were originally to be played over two legs, but were played as single matches after the format change due to the COVID-19 pandemic.

In the final, which was played as a single match, if the score was level at the end of normal time, extra time was also not to be played and the winners would be decided by a penalty shoot-out.

The mechanism of the draws for each round was as follows:
In the draw for the quarter-finals, the four group winners were seeded, and the four group runners-up were unseeded. The seeded teams were drawn against the unseeded teams, with the seeded teams hosting the second leg. Teams from the same group could not be drawn against each other, while teams from the same association could be drawn against each other.
In the draws for semi-finals, there were no seedings, and teams from the same group or the same association could be drawn against each other. As the draws for the quarter-finals and semi-finals were held together before the quarter-finals were played, the identity of the quarter-final winners was not known at the time of the semi-final draw.

Qualified teams
The knockout phase involves the 8 teams which qualify as winners and runners-up of each of the eight groups in the group stage.

Bracket
The bracket of the knockout stage is determined as follows:

The bracket was decided after the draw for the knockout stage (quarter-finals and semi-finals), which was held on 5 February 2020, 19:00 CAT (UTC+2), at the Hilton Pyramids Golf in Cairo, Egypt.

Quarter-finals
The draw for the quarter-finals was held on 5 February 2020.

Summary
The first legs were played on 1 March, and the second legs were played on 8 March 2020.

|}

Matches

Pyramids won 3–1 on aggregate.

Hassania Agadir won 7–0 on aggregate.

RS Berkane won 3–2 on aggregate.

Horoya won 3–1 on aggregate.

Semi-finals
The draw for the semi-finals was held on 5 February 2020 (after the quarter-finals draw).

Summary

Due to the COVID-19 pandemic in Africa, all semi-final matches, originally scheduled for 1–2 May (first legs) and 8–9 May 2020 (second legs), were postponed until further notice. The matches were later rescheduled as single matches in Morocco for 19–20 October 2020, at Prince Moulay Abdellah Stadium, Rabat and Stade Mohamed V, Casablanca.

|}

Matches

Final

Due to the COVID-19 pandemic, the final, originally scheduled for 24 May 2020, 19:00 GMT, at the Prince Moulay Abdellah Stadium, Rabat, Morocco, was postponed until further notice. The final was later rescheduled for 25 October 2020.

Notes

References

External links
Total CAF Confederation Cup, CAFonline.com
CAF Total Confederation Cup 2019/20

3
March 2020 sports events in Africa
October 2020 sports events in Africa